The 2007 National League Division Series (NLDS), the opening round of the 2007 National League playoffs, began on Wednesday, October 3 and ended on Saturday, October 6, with the champions of the three NL divisions and one wild card team participating in two best-of-five series. They were:
 (1) Arizona Diamondbacks (Western Division champions, 90–72) vs. (3) Chicago Cubs (Central Division champions, 85–77): Diamondbacks win series, 3–0.
 (2) Philadelphia Phillies (Eastern Division champions, 89–73) vs. (4) Colorado Rockies (Wild Card qualifier, 90–73): Rockies win series, 3–0.

Colorado earned the wild card after winning a one-game playoff with San Diego. Although the division winner with the best record normally plays the wild card team, the Diamondbacks played the Cubs, rather than the wild card Rockies, because the league did not pair teams from the same division against each other in the division series.

Both series represented the first time the opponents had met in the postseason, and the Rockies' victory was their first in any postseason series. The Diamondbacks and the Rockies met in the NL Championship Series, with the Rockies becoming the National League champion and going on to lose to the American League champion Boston Red Sox in the 2007 World Series. 



Matchups

Arizona Diamondbacks vs. Chicago Cubs

Philadelphia Phillies vs. Colorado Rockies

Arizona vs. Chicago

Game 1
Chase Field in Phoenix, Arizona

Eighteen-game winners Carlos Zambrano and Brandon Webb matched each other pitch for pitch in the opening game of the series. The Diamondbacks struck first on Stephen Drew's fourth-inning home run. The Cubs loaded the bases in the sixth on two walks and a hit with two outs, but only scored once on Ryan Theriot's RBI single that tied the game. Carlos Mármol would take the loss in relief of Zambrano, allowing a lead off home run to Mark Reynolds in the seventh, then, one out later, walking Chris Snyder, who moved to third on Augie Ojeda's double and scored on a sacrifice fly by Conor Jackson. José Valverde threw a hitless ninth inning to save the game for Arizona.

Game 2
Chase Field in Phoenix, Arizona

The Cubs struck first in Game 2 when Matt Murton singled to lead off the second off of Doug Davis before Geovany Soto's home run put them up 2–0, but starter Ted Lilly in the bottom of the inning allowed a leadoff single to Chris Snyder, then walked Justin Upton before Chris Young's three-run home run two outs later put them up 3–2. Stephen Drew then singled and scored on Eric Byrnes's triple to make it 4–2 Arizona. In the fourth, Lilly allowed a leadoff single to Augie Ojeda, then walked Young one out later before Drew's triple made it 6–2 Arizona and knocked him out of the game. Kevin Hart walked two with one out next inning before being relieved by Scott Eyre, who allowed an RBI single to Ojeda that put Upton at third. Michael Wuertz relieved Eyre and Davis's fielder choice scored another run for Arizona. In the seventh, Davis walked two with two outs before being relieved by Juan Cruz, who allowed a two-run double to pinch hitter Daryle Ward that made it 8–4 Arizona. However, neither team would score for the rest of the game, so the Diamondbacks went up 2–0 in the series heading to Chicago.

Game 3
Wrigley Field in Chicago, Illinois

Chris Young's home run on the first pitch of the game off of Rich Hill gave Arizona a quick 1–0 lead. Stephen Drew then doubled to right field and after two strikeouts and a walk, scored on Justin Upton's single. Hill would leave the game in the fourth after allowing a lead-off walk and single. Michael Wuertz in relief walked Young to load the bases, then struck out Drew before Eric Byrnes hit into a forceout at second that scored Miguel Montero. The Cubs cut Arizona's lead to 3–1 in the bottom of the inning off of Liván Hernández when Mark DeRosa hit a leadoff single, moved to third on Jacque Jones's double, and scored on Jason Kendall's groundout. However, Hernandez would only allow three other hits in six innings. Solo home runs by Byrnes in the sixth off of Carlos Marmol and Drew in the ninth off of Kerry Wood capped the scoring as the Diamondbacks' 5–1 win completed a sweep of the Cubs, who hit into four double plays.

Composite box
2007 NLDS (3–0): Arizona Diamondbacks over Chicago Cubs

Philadelphia vs. Colorado

Game 1
Citizens Bank Park in Philadelphia, Pennsylvania

This was the Phillies' first postseason game since Game 6 of the 1993 World Series, and their first at Citizens Bank Park.
Seventeen and fifteen-game winners Jeff Francis and Cole Hamels began the 2007 postseason by retiring the side in order. The face of the game quickly changed in the second inning when Todd Helton tripled to center field in his first career postseason plate appearance. He would score on Garrett Atkins's double. After Brad Hawpe struck out and Ryan Spilborghs walked, Yorvit Torrealba's single scored Atkins. A two-out walk to Kaz Matsui loaded the bases before another walk to rookie Troy Tulowitzki gave the Rockies a 3–0 lead they never relinquished. Matt Holliday homered off of Tom Gordon in the eighth inning to provide insurance after consecutive home runs by Aaron Rowand and Pat Burrell led off the Phillies' half of the fifth. The Phillies wasted an ultimately solid effort from Hamels, who walked four in  frames but did not allow a hit after the decisive second inning. Manny Corpas picked up the save for Colorado.

Game 2
Citizens Bank Park in Philadelphia, Pennsylvania

Troy Tulowitzki and Matt Holliday hit consecutive one-out home runs in the first inning off Phillies rookie starter Kyle Kendrick, but his team responded with Jimmy Rollins' lead-off home run in the bottom of the inning off of Rockies starter Franklin Morales, coming off his own rookie season. Rollins' two-run triple next inning gave the Phillies a 3–2 lead. That lead then vanished two innings later when Kaz Matsui hit a two-out grand slam off Phillies reliever Kyle Lohse. José Mesa walked two to lead off the sixth, then Yorvit Torrealba's two-run double put the Rockies up 8–3. After Josh Fogg bunted out, Clay Condrey relieved Mesa and allowed an RBI triple to Matsui. Tulowitzki struck out before Holliday's RBI single made it 10–3 Rockies. Ryan Howard hit a leadoff home run in the bottom of the inning off of Jeremy Affeldt. In the seventh, Shane Victorino singled with one out off of Ryan Speier, advanced to third on a stolen base attempt and Torrealba's throwing error, and scored on Rollins's groundout. Philadelphia loaded the bases in the eighth inning, but Manny Corpas earned a four-out save in stranding all three runners, sealing the Rockies' 10–5 victory. Matsui was a single short of hitting for the cycle.

Game 3
Coors Field in Denver, Colorado

The Rockies struck first in the fifth off of starter Jamie Moyer when Yorvit Torrealba singled with one out, moved to second on Ubaldo Jiménez's sacrifice bunt, and scored on Kazuo Matsui's triple. Shane Victorino's home run to right in the top of the seventh tied the game. After being released mid-season by the Red Sox, J. C. Romero became one of the most reliable bullpen arms for the Phillies down the stretch by not giving up a single run in  innings pitched in September. Unfortunately for Philadelphia in Game 3, Romero faltered and surrendered three straight two-out singles, the last of which to Jeff Baker scored the go-ahead run in the bottom of the eighth. Manny Corpas came on to nail down his third consecutive save in the ninth, sealing the series sweep. Brian Fuentes earned the win with a 1-2-3 eighth. The last time Philadelphia was swept in a postseason series was the 1976 NLCS, in which Cincinnati beat them, 3–0.

Composite box
2007 NLDS (3–0): Colorado Rockies over Philadelphia Phillies

See also
 2007 American League Division Series

Notes

External links
 ARI vs. CHC at Baseball-Reference
 COL vs. PHI at Baseball-Reference

National League Division Series
National League Division Series
Colorado Rockies postseason
Arizona Diamondbacks postseason
Philadelphia Phillies postseason
Chicago Cubs postseason
2000s in Chicago
2000s in Denver
2007 in Philadelphia
2000s in Phoenix, Arizona
National League Division Series
National League Division
National League Division
National League Division
National League Division
Baseball competitions in Chicago
Baseball competitions in Denver
Baseball competitions in Philadelphia
Baseball competitions in Phoenix, Arizona